Live Heroes is a compilation album recorded by Nico with the Blue Orchids partially at the København Saltlagertet, Rotterdam, Netherlands, on October 5, 1982. The two tracks "Procession" and "All Tomorrow's Parties" come from a studio session recorded with the Invisible Girls and Martin Hannett.

Track listing

"Heroes" – 8:19 (David Bowie, Brian Eno)
"Procession" – 4:45 (Nico)
"My Funny Valentine" – 4:07 (Richard Rodgers, Lorenz Hart)
"All Tomorrow's Parties" – 5:28 (Lou Reed)
"Valley of the Kings" – 3:10 (Nico)
"Femme Fatale" – 3:07 (Lou Reed)
"The End" – 9:51 (The Doors)

Personnel
Nico – vocal, harmonium

The Blue Orchids:
Martin Bramah – guitar, backing vocals
Rick Goldstraw – guitar
Una Baines – keyboards
Steve Garvey – bass, backing vocals
Toby Toman – drums

References

External links
Individual track info, lyrics

Nico albums
1986 live albums